According to Benoit Mandelbrot, "A fractal is by definition a set for which the Hausdorff-Besicovitch dimension strictly exceeds the topological dimension."
Presented here is a list of fractals, ordered by increasing Hausdorff dimension, to illustrate what it means for a fractal to have a low or a high dimension.

Deterministic fractals

Random and natural fractals

See also

 Fractal dimension
 Hausdorff dimension
 Scale invariance

Notes and references

Further reading

External links
 The fractals on Mathworld
 Other fractals on Paul Bourke's website
 Soler's Gallery
 Fractals on mathcurve.com
 1000fractales.free.fr - Project gathering fractals created with various software
 Fractals unleashed
 IFStile - software that computes the dimension of the boundary of self-affine tiles

Hausdorff Dimension
Hausdorff Dimension
Mathematics-related lists